The 3rd Asian Cross Country Championships took place 1995 in Chiba, Japan. Team rankings were decided by a combination of each nation's top three athletes finishing positions.

Medalists

Medal table

References
Results

Asian Cross Country Championships
Asian Cross Country
Asian Cross Country
Asian Cross Country
Sport in Chiba (city)
International athletics competitions hosted by Japan